Gorreth Namugga is a Ugandan politician. In 2021, she was elected as the representative member of parliament for Mawogola county, south district. She is from the leading opposition party, National Unity Platform. Namugga is the first opposition politician to win an elective position in Sembabule since 1986.

Work experience 
She served as the district service commission chairperson and owns schools in Sembabule. She was the former principal procurement officer for Masaka city.

Parliamentary duties 
Namugga currently serves as the shadow minister of Science, Innovations & Technology. Namugga presented the minority report on the 2022/2023 budget.,

References 

Year of birth missing (living people)
Living people
21st-century Ugandan politicians
21st-century Ugandan women politicians
Members of the Parliament of Uganda
Women members of the Parliament of Uganda